Hemiuridae is a family of trematodes belonging to the order Plagiorchiida containing 514 described species.

Genera

Genera:
 Adinosoma Manter, 1947
 Allostomachicola Yamaguti, 1958
 Aphanuroides Nagaty & Abdel-Aal, 1962
 Aphanurus Looss, 1907
 Broreascotia Bray & Zdzitowiecki, 2000 
 Brachyphallus Odhner, 1905
 Bunocotyle Odhner, 1928
 Catarinatrema Teixeira de Freitas & Santos, 1971
 Cyatholecithochirium Yamaguti, 1970
 Dinosoma Manter, 1934
 Dinurus Looss, 1907
 Dissosaccus Manter, 1947
 Duosphincter Manter & Pritchard, 1960
 Ectenurus Looss, 1907
 Elytrophalloides Szidat, 1955
 Elytrophallus Manter, 1940
 Erilepturus Woolcock, 1935
 Genolinea Manter, 1925
 Glomericirrus Yamaguti, 1937
 Gonocerella
 Hemiurus Rudolphi, 1809
 Hypohepaticola Yamaguti, 1934
 Indoderogenes Srivastava, 1941
 Lecithochirium Lühe, 1901
 Lecithocladium Lühe, 1901
 Lethadena Manter, 1947
 Mecoderus Manter, 1940
 Merlucciotrema Yamaguti, 1971
 Mitrostoma Manter, 1954
 Monolecithotrema Yamaguti, 1970
 Musculovesicula Yamaguti, 1940
 Myosaccium Montgomery, 1957
 Neopisthadena Machida, 1980
 Neotheletrum Gibson & Bray, 1979
 Opisthadena Linton, 1910
 Paradinurus Vigueras, 1958
 Parahemiurus Vaz & Pereira, 1930
 Paralecithochirium Zhang, 1994
 Plerurus Looss, 1907
 Plicatrium Manter & Pritchard, 1960
 Prolecithochirium Yamaguti, 1970
 Pronopyee
 Pseudocypseluritrema Parukhin, 1974
 Pseudodinosoma Yamaguti, 1970
 Pulmovermis Coil & Kuntz, 1960
 Qadriana Bilqees, 1971
 Robinia Pankov, Webster, Blasco-Costa, Gibson, Littlewood, Balbuena & Kostadinova, 2006
 Saturnius Manter, 1969
 Saurokoilophilia Bursey, Goldberg & Kraus, 2008
 Sterrhurina Abdel Aal, Banaja & Al Zanbagi, 1984
 Stomachicola Yamaguti, 1934
 Synaptobothrioides Bray & Nahhas, 2002
 Synaptobothrium von Linstow, 1904
 Theletrum Linton, 1910
 Tricotyledonia Fyfe, 1954
 Tubulovesicula Yamaguti, 1934

References

Plagiorchiida